E263 can refer to:
European route E263, a European route
Calcium acetate, a chemical compound